is a 1964 Japanese drama film based on a novel by Sawako Ariyoshi and directed by Keisuke Kinoshita. Screened in two parts, it was one of Kinoshita's last cinema productions before working mainly for television.

Plot
Spanning in time from the Russo-Japanese War (1904–1905) to the post World War II era, The Scent of Incense depicts the ongoing conflicts in the troubled relationship between Tomoko and her mother Ikuyo. Ikuyo, who is about to remarry, leaves Tomoko with her grandmother Tsuna, only to sell her to a geisha house after Tsuna's death. When the women meet again, Ikuyo has herself turned to prostitution. Tomoko, now a geisha, starts a relationship with cadet Ezaki with the prospect of marriage, but his family denies its approval due to Ikuyo's profession. Having become independent as the madam of her own geisha house, Tomoko loses her property in the 1923 earthquake. While her mother marries a third time, this time former servant Hachiran, Tomoko refuses the offer of Nozawa to become his mistress. Amidst the ruins of a bomb-ridden Tokyo, where Tomoko and Ikuyo live in a cellar, the mother is reunited with Hachiran who had gone missing during the Second World War. Tomoko hears of the imprisonment and death sentence of Ezaki for a war crime, but when she is finally admitted to visit him in jail after months of waiting, he pretends not to know her. After Ikuyo's death in a traffic accident while Tomoko is in hospital, Hachiran returns to his home town. The film closes with Tomoko having Ikuyo's name added to the family shrine, suggesting her coming to peace with her mother.

Cast
 Mariko Okada as Tomoko
 Nobuko Otowa as Ikuyo
 Kinuyo Tanaka as Tsuna
 Go Kato as Ezaki
 Haruko Sugimura as Taromaru
 Eiji Okada as Nozawa
 Kazuo Kitamura as Keisuke
 Norihei Miki as Hachiran

Notes

References

External links
 
 
 

1964 films
Japanese drama films
1960s Japanese-language films
Japanese black-and-white films
Films based on Japanese novels
Films directed by Keisuke Kinoshita
1964 drama films
1960s Japanese films